The Duolingo English Test (DET), is a standardized test of English language proficiency for non-native English language speakers. DET was developed by education technology company Duolingo and released in 2016. The test is used by many universities and institutions as an accepted measure of English proficiency. Ireland accepts the test as part of its student visa program. DET is an online, adaptive test. Few universities in UK such as Kingston University, University of Southampton, Middlesex University, Glasgow Caledonian University, University of Exeter, Cardiff Metropolitan University also accept the Duolingo test.

The Duolingo English Test is entirely computer-based and can be taken from any location with an internet connection. The test is scored on a scale of 10-160, with scores above 120 considered to be proficient in English. The test is adaptive, which means that the difficulty level of the questions adjusts to the test-taker's ability level.

One of the main advantages of the Duolingo English Test is its convenience and accessibility. Test-takers can take the test at any time, from anywhere in the world, and receive their results within 48 hours. Additionally, the test is affordable and typically costs less than other English proficiency tests such as TOEFL or IELTS.

See also 

 English as a second or foreign language
 International Student Admissions Test (ISAT)
 National Accreditation Authority for Translators and Interpreters (NAATI)
 Teaching English as a second or foreign language (TEFL)

External links

References 

Duolingo
English-language education
Standardized tests for English language
English language tests